Galactan (galactosan) is a polysaccharide consisting of polymerized galactose. In general, galactans in natural sources contain a core of galactose units connected by α(1→3) or α(1→6), with structures containing other monosaccharides as side-chains.

Galactan derived from Anogeissus latifolia is primarily α(1→6), but galactan from acacia trees is primarily α(1→3).

Halymenia durvillei is a red seaweed (algae) with a great potential as sulphated galactan producer. Several other alga species also contain galactans. Including ''Carpopeltis .

See also
 Agar
 Galactooligosaccharide

References

Carbohydrates